Largo Winch (released in the U.S. as The Heir Apparent: Largo Winch) is a 2008 French action thriller film based on the Belgian comic book of the same name. It was released in France and Belgium on 17 December 2008, and in the United States in November 2011, where it was nominated for Best International Film at the 2012 Saturn Awards. A sequel, The Burma Conspiracy, was released in Belgium 16 February 2011.

Plot

In Hong Kong, Nerio Winch, who is the owner and majority shareholder of W-Group is killed by an unknown man at his yacht Neretva. The next day, the W-Group board of directors meets up with Ann Ferguson, Nerio's right-hand man to discuss the situation. They recently found out that Nerio had a secret son named Largo Winch, who was adopted from a Yugoslavian orphanage and was kept as a secret from everyone, was raised by Josip and Hana, a French-Croatian family to whom Nerio was close, along with Josip and Hana's own son Goran, until Nerio picked him up and raised him to take over his company. Other members are skeptical of Largo's existence, but they want to bring him in to see if he truly is his heir. 

Meanwhile, Largo is in Brazil, where he rescues a young woman named Léa, an NGO, who was being harassed by a local militia. While Largo is asleep, Léa injects him with a sedative and walks away, and Largo, while sedated, is captured by the militia and sent to prison. However, he is rescued by Nerio's former bodyguard Freddy, who knew of his existence, and they depart to Hong Kong for Nerio's funeral. Largo gets drunk and the secret is revealed to the public, where he wakes up on a yacht with Nerio's former butler telling him that Freddy dropped him. Largo arrives to the W-Group's headquarters and presents himself to the board of directors. He correctly states facts about each of them and also correctly explains the business ethics of the W-Group and handling the stocks to prove that he is Nerio's son and knows everything about the W-Group. 

Meyer, a senior employer goes to meet him, but he is shot dead by an unknown assassin. Largo chases him with the help of Stephan Marcus, but is unable to find him. While leaving for lunch with the W-Group's competitor Michail Korsky, Largo is shocked to find Léa with him and follows her to a spa, where she flees from him, but he finds out that her real name is Naomi and that she works for him. Soon after, Korsky announces his intentions to buy the W-Group. Ferguson wishes to secretly buy Korsky's corporation so he would be unable to do, but it is only possible if the offer is made from a private individual and Largo is able to do so. Since the other members are unwilling to lend money for Largo, who are still skeptical about his actions, Largo decides to bring them secret stocks that Nerio kept and trusted Largo. So, he could prove to them that he can perform the deal. 

Largo travels back to his childhood home in Dalmatia, where he meets with Hana, who is now a widow, since Josip died years earlier. Largo also meets with Goran, who is now a soldier in the Croatian Army. They have a meal together before Goran leaves the family home. The next day, Hana wakes up and finds Largo gone, only finding a note from him. Soon enough, she is attacked by an armed group, led by Marcus, who had tracked Largo through a GPS in his credit card. After finding out from the note that Largo has departed for Sarajevo, Marcus kills her. However, Largo has travelled to a secret island, containing a monastery, where Nerio has a secret safe in which he holds his stocks. After unlocking the safe, he is cornered by Marcus. After taking his shares, Marcus tries to kill him, but Largo escapes and jumps into the sea, although he is shot and badly injured. He wakes up next day in the home of his childhood friend Melina, since her cousin found Largo unconscious. 

Soon after, Largo contacts Freddy, telling him that he will contact him soon. However, Freddy meets with Ferguson, who reveals that she organized Nerio's death in order to lure Largo. She also manipulated Korsky into announcing the buy-in of the W-Group and in turn, Largo would bring up the shares and Ferguson would secretly buy a controlling stake in Korsky's group, making her an influential person. She also admits that Naomi is working for her, and that she found Largo and falsely set up charges for drug smuggling against him and had killed Meyer, who wants to reveal her plans to Korsky. Freddy requests the plan for hostile takeover of Korsky's group so he could become rich in exchange for tracking down Largo. Ferguson agrees and sends Marcus for him, but he is tied up when Freddy contacts Largo again and tries to silently warn him. 

Meanwhile, Melina drives Largo to a small airport, where Korsky arrives in his private jet. Largo explains to Korsky about Ferguson's plans and Naomi's treachery, and that he has to leave for Hong Kong before a large ceremony is planned, where Ferguson intends to announce the new heir to the W-Group, apparently her secret weapon. Korsky agrees and withholds his original plan to buy the W-Group. In Hong Kong, Korsky drives to the meet where he is cornered by Marcus, but cannot find Largo. Instead, Largo meets with Naomi, who reveals she is a mercenary for hire, and contacts Marcus when Largo refuses to pay her up, and Largo agrees to pay her, and she leaves the car. However, Marcus catches up with Largo, intending to stop him from arriving to the meet. After a high-speed chase, Largo manages to enter the W-Group headquarters, where he disguises himself. He arrives at the penthouse, where much to his shock, finds Goran. Goran recalls the events when he and Largo broke into the orphanage to find Largo's records. 

Largo was found and captured, but Goran managed to hide. He was about to leave, but kept searching the records about Largo, but found his "own" records, revealing that he was also adopted by Nerio, along with Largo and is also an heir to Nerio's company. Ferguson contacted him to represent the company while Ferguson would really have the power, in exchange for money. However, When Largo informs him that Ferguson, using Marcus, killed Hana, he changes his mind and agrees to help him. Marcus arrives and Goran pretends to help Marcus, while secretly telling him in Serbian that he is at Largo's side. 

They fight Marcus together, but Marcus manages to shoot Goran. A fight ensues between Largo and Marcus, who almost throws Largo off the building, until Largo uses the last of his strength and kills Marcus. Goran begs for Largo's forgiveness, and Largo forgives him as Goran dies from his injuries. After rescuing Freddy, the two arrive at the meet, where Freddy plays a recording of his meeting with Ferguson while Largo arrives with his shares, which he took while visiting Goran. Defeated, Ferguson walks out of the stage and bitterly congratulates Largo for his victory. Largo reveals his identity to the gathered audience and plans to take over the W-Group to a thunderous applause.

Cast

Reception
, the film holds a 53% approval rating on Rotten Tomatoes, based on 19 reviews with an average rating of 5.38/10.

See also
Largo Winch (TV series)

References

External links

Première bande-annonce

2008 films
French action thriller films
2000s French-language films
Films based on Belgian comics
Belgian action thriller films
Pan-Européenne films
2000s business films
Films scored by Alexandre Desplat
Films directed by Jérôme Salle
Adaptations of works by Jean Van Hamme
Live-action films based on comics
2008 action thriller films
English-language French films
Films about inheritances
Films set in Hong Kong
Films shot in Hong Kong
Films set in Croatia
Films shot in Croatia
Films set in Brazil
Films shot in Brazil
French-language Belgian films
2000s French films